Ezhichur is a neighbourhood in Kanchipuram district of Tamil Nadu state in the peninsular India. Thollazhi, Chennakuppam, Ullavur, Devariyambakkam and Vadakkuppattu are some of the important neighbourhoods of Ezhichur. There is a Coronavirus treatment center at Ezhichur. Ezhichur is connected to Tambaram via. road and there is only one bus plying between Tambaram and Ezhichur and people demand for more bus services. A Shiva temple viz., Nallinakkeswarar Temple is situated in Ezhichur. Ezhichur area falls under the Kancheepuram Assembly constituency. The winner of the election held in the year 2021 as the member of its assembly constituency is C. V. M. P. Ezhilarasan. Also, this area belongs to Kancheepuram Lok Sabha constituency. G. Selvam won the 2019 elections, as the member of its Lok Sabha constituency.

References

External link 
 Geohack

Villages in Kanchipuram district